Michael H. Lawlor  (March 11, 1854 – August 3, 1918), was a Major League Baseball catcher who played two seasons in the majors during the 19th century.

References

External links

1854 births
1918 deaths
Major League Baseball catchers
Baseball players from New York (state)
19th-century baseball players
Troy Trojans players
Washington Nationals (UA) players
Guelph Maple Leafs players
Albany M. N. Nolan players
Utica Pent Ups players
Bradford (minor league baseball) players